Chakeri (also Romanized as Chakerī) is a village in Nakhlestan Rural District, in the Central District of Kahnuj County, Kerman Province, Iran. At the 2006 census, its population was 347, in 77 families.

Sister Cities

Chakeri, India

References 

Populated places in Kahnuj County